The Nash-Reid-Hill House is a historic house at 418 West Matthews Avenue in Jonesboro, Arkansas.  It is a -story wood-frame house, faced in brick veneer, with a hipped roof that has multiple cross gables and a three-story tower with a conical roof.  The house was built between 1898 and 1902, using locally fired brick, and is a locally notable example of Queen Anne architecture, although its porch was modified in 1934 to give it a more French Eclectic appearance.  It is also notable for its association with the locally prominent Nash family, who have long been prominent businessmen and landowners in the years since the American Civil War.

The house was listed on the National Register of Historic Places in 1994.

See also
National Register of Historic Places listings in Craighead County, Arkansas

References

Houses on the National Register of Historic Places in Arkansas
Queen Anne architecture in Arkansas
Renaissance Revival architecture in Arkansas
1902 establishments in Arkansas
Houses in Craighead County, Arkansas
National Register of Historic Places in Craighead County, Arkansas
Buildings and structures in Jonesboro, Arkansas